Yang Yao-hsun (born 22 January 1983 in Taitung City, Taiwan) is a Taiwanese professional baseball pitcher / Outfielder for the Fubon Guardians of the Chinese Professional Baseball League (CPBL). He has played in Nippon Professional Baseball pitcher for the Fukuoka SoftBank Hawks.

Career
Yang played for the Fukuoka SoftBank Hawks of Nippon Professional Baseball from 2006 until 2013 before expressing his desire to sign in America because of his MLB dream.

On 13 February 2014 he signed a minor league deal with an invite to Spring training with the Pittsburgh Pirates. He was assigned to the Altoona Curve to begin the season but was released on July 10, 2014.

He signed with the Lamigo Monkeys of  CPBL in 2015 and still has played for the club through 2021.

International career
Yang competed for Chinese Taipei in the 2005 Asian Baseball Championship, 2006 World Baseball Classic, 2006 Intercontinental Cup, 2010 Asian Games, 2013 World Baseball Classic Qualification and 2013 World Baseball Classic.

Pitching style
Yang is a 5 ft 10 in, 190 lb left-handed pitcher. he throws a low 90s fastball, along with a slider, curveball, and a splitter. He mostly uses his fastball-slider combination in games.

Personal life
Yang is the brother of fellow professional baseball player Yang Dai-Kang. He is a member of the Amis tribe and descendant of the famous warrior Kolas Mahengheng.

References

External links

, or NPB, or CPBL

1983 births
Living people
Altoona Curve players
Asian Games medalists in baseball
Asian Games silver medalists for Chinese Taipei
Baseball outfielders
Baseball players at the 2010 Asian Games
Fukuoka SoftBank Hawks players
Lamigo Monkeys players
Rakuten Monkeys players
Medalists at the 2010 Asian Games
Nippon Professional Baseball pitchers
Amis people
People from Taitung County
Taiwanese expatriate baseball players in Japan
Taiwanese expatriate baseball players in the United States
2006 World Baseball Classic players
2013 World Baseball Classic players